Ghassan al-Zamel (born 1963) is a Syrian politician serving as Minister of Electricity in the Second Hussein Arnous government.

Early life, education and career 
He was born in Damascus in 1963. A professor in electrical engineering from Damascus University in 1993.

He started his career at the General Company of Electricity in  Daraa  in 1995, served as Head of the Mediterranean Emergency Maintenance Service from 2000 to 2011 and a Director of Operation in 2012 and an  Assistant Director of the Electricity Company in  Daraa in 2014 and General Manager of the Electricity Company in Daraa Governorate from 2017 to 2020.

Personal life
Ghassan al-Zamel is married with three sons.

References 

Living people
1963 births
21st-century Syrian politicians
Syrian ministers of electricity
Damascus University alumni